Katiadi is an upazila of Kishoreganj District in the Division of Dhaka, Bangladesh.

Geography

Katiadi Upazila is the largest upazila of Kishoreganj district, with an area of 219.22 km2. It is bounded by Kishoreganj Sadar and Karimganj Upazilas on the north, Belabo and Monohardi upazilas on the south, Nikli and Bajitpur upazilas on the east, and Pakundia Upazila on the west. Purushbadhia, Doba and Reksa Beels are notable.

Demographics
As of the 1991 Bangladesh census, Katiadi had a population of 264,501, across 49,488 households. Males constituted 50.24% of the population and females 49.76%. The number of adults over the age of 18 is 125,001. Katiadi had an average literacy rate of 20.3% (7+ years), compared to the national average of 32.4%.

Street and railway
There have many Street in this upazila.
Also have two railway station in Katidai

1.Gachihata Railway Station

2.Manik Khali Railway Station

Administration 
Katiadi thana became an upazila in 1983. Katiadi was declared a municipality in 1999.

The union parishads are subdivided into 97 mauzas and 156 villages.

Kaitadi Municipality is subdivided into 9 wards and 20 mahallas.

Dr.Mustakakur Rahman is the chairman of Katiadi Upazila.
Mr.Nur Mohammad Ex IGP of Bangladesh Police is running MP of Parliament from Katiadi -Pakundia.

See also 
 Upazilas of Bangladesh
 Districts of Bangladesh
 Divisions of Bangladesh

References

Dhaka Division
Kishoreganj District